Alexandre Levy (10 November, 1864 – 17 January, 1892) was a Brazilian composer, pianist and conductor. Born in São Paulo, he pioneered a fusion of classical composition with Brazil's popular folk music and rhythms. Levy died prematurely at the age of 27, and  His hometown grants a prestigious award in his name. 

Darius Milhaud, in his ballet Le Bœuf sur le toit, borrowed a theme from Levy's Tango Brasileiro.

List of piano works

1880
 Fantasia para dois pianos a partir de temas da ópera O Guarany

1881
 Impromptu-Caprice, op. 1

1882
 Fosca, fantasia brilhante, op. 3
 3 Improvisations, op. 4
 Romance sans paroles
 A la Hongroise
 Pensée fugitive
 Valsa-Capricho, op. 5
 Mazurca n. 1, op. 6 no 1
 Mazurca n. 2, op. 6 no 2
 Recuerdos - Polca de Salão

1883
 Causerie
 Cavalcante
 Collin Maillard
 Étude
 Je t'en prie
 Petite marche

1885
 Plaintive
 Scherzo-valse, op. 9

1887
 Improviso n. 2
 Trois Morceaux, op. 13
 Coeur blessé
 Amour passé
 Doute
 Allegro Appassionato, op. 14
 Variations sur un thème populaire brésilien (Vem Cá, Bitu)

1890
 Tango Brasileiro
 Samba (Suite Brésilienne, IV.)

1891
 Schumanniana, op. 16
 Allegretto, ma un poco agitato
 Allegro moderato
 Lento
 Allegretto giocoso
 Moderato assai
 Allegro
 Moderato
 Allegro molto - Presto

Date of composition unknown
 Papillonnage
 En mer (poème musical) a quatro mãos
 Depart. Mer Calme
 Le Ciel s'assombrit. Tempête
 Clair de Lune. Idylle Fugitive
 Comala (poème musical)

Further reading
Bettencourt, Gastão de. Temas de música brasileira. Rio de Janeiro: Ed. A Noite, 1941.
Mariz, Vasco. História da Mùsica no Brasil. Rio de Janeiro: Nova Fronteira, 2005. 6ª edição, pp. 116–8.
Cacciatore, Olga Gudolle. Dicionário biográfico de música erudita brasileira. Rio de Janeiro, Forense Universitária, 2005.

References

Biografia na página da Academia Brasileira de Música

1864 births
1892 deaths
19th-century composers
Brazilian classical composers
Brazilian Jews
Brazilian male composers
Musicians from São Paulo
19th-century male musicians